Allgojirca or Allqu Hirka (Quechua allqu dog, hirka mountain, "dog mountain", also spelled Allgojirca) is a mountain in the Andes of Peru which reaches a height of approximately . It is located in the Ancash Region, Bolognesi Province, Huallanca District.

References

Mountains of Peru
Mountains of Ancash Region